Rane Polytechnic College (RPTC) is a polytechnic college situated near Sethurapatti village in Tiruchirappalli district, India. It was started in the year 2010 as a CSR initiative of Rane Group of Companies.

External links
Official website

References

Colleges in India
Engineering colleges in Tamil Nadu
Education in Tiruchirappalli district
Educational institutions established in 2010
2010 establishments in Tamil Nadu